The deaf sign language of the nations of the former Yugoslavia, known variously as Croatian Sign Language (Hrvatski znakovni jezik, HZJ), Kosovar Sign Language, Serbian Sign Language, Bosnian Sign Language, Macedonian Sign Language, Slovenian Sign Language, or Yugoslav Sign Language (YSL), got its start when children were sent to schools for the deaf in Austro-Hungary in the early 19th century. The first two local schools opened in 1840 in Slovenia and in 1885 in Croatia.

Dialectical distinctions remain between the language in the various countries, with separate (as well as unified) dictionaries being published.  These varieties are reported to be mutually intelligible, but the actual amount of variation, and the degree to which the varieties should be considered one language or separate languages, has not been systematically assessed; nor is much known about the sign language situation in these Balkan states.

A two-handed manual alphabet is in widespread use; a one-handed alphabet based on the American manual alphabet, though less commonly used, has official status.

In Bosnia and Herzegovina, the deaf have the same language rights with sign language as the hearing do with oral language. Interpreters must be provided for deaf people dealing with government bodies, and government television broadcasts must be translated into sign language. A Commission for the Sign Language is composed of members representing education, linguistics/pedagogy, and the three constituent nations of Bosnia. By law, Croatian Radiotelevision is to promote the translation of programs into sign language.

References

External links 
  Dictionary of Croatian Sign Language

French Sign Language family
Languages of Croatia
Languages of Bosnia and Herzegovina
Languages of Serbia
Languages of Slovenia